Joseph Kwame Kyeretwie Boakye Danquah (18 December 1895 – 4 February 1965) was a Ghanaian politician, scholar, lawyer and statesman. He was a politician in pre- and post-colonial Ghana, which was formerly the Gold Coast, and is credited with giving Ghana its current name. 

During his political career, Danquah was one of the primary opposition leaders to Ghanaian president and independence leader Kwame Nkrumah. Danquah was described as the "doyen of Gold Coast politics" by the Watson Commission of Inquiry into the 1948 Accra riots.

Being a scholar and a historian, he researched the history of the Akan peoples, and chose a name for their country that would suit the new country which was to gain independence. The name was intended to remind the generations to come of their origin and history as a nation.

Early life and education 
Danquah was born on 18 December 1895 in the town of Bepong in Kwahu in the Eastern Region of Ghana (then the Gold Coast). He was descended from the royal family of Ofori Panin Fie, once the rulers of the Akyem states, and one of the most influential families in Ghanaian politics. His elder brother was Nana Sir Ofori Atta I and his son was actor Paul Danquah.

At the age of six, Danquah began schooling at the Basel Mission School at Kyebi. He attended the Basel Mission Senior School at Begoro. On successful completion of his standard seven examinations in 1912, he was employed by Vidal J. Buckle, a barrister-at-law in Accra, as a clerk, a job that aroused his interest in law.

After passing the Civil Service Examinations in 1914, Danquah became a clerk at the Supreme Court of the Gold Coast, which gave him the experience to be appointed by his brother, Nana Sir Ofori Atta I, who had become chief two years earlier, as secretary of the Omanhene's Tribunal in Kyebi. Following the influence of his brother, Danquah was appointed as the assistant secretary of the Conference of Paramount Chiefs of the Eastern Province, which was later given statutory recognition to become the Eastern Provincial Council of Chiefs. His brilliance influenced his brother to send him to Britain in 1921 to read law.

After two unsuccessful attempts at the University of London matriculation, Danquah passed in 1922, enabling him to enter the University College of London as a philosophy student. He earned his B.A. degree in 1925, winning the John Stuart Mill Scholarship in the Philosophy of Mind and Logic. He then embarked on a Doctor of Philosophy degree, which he earned in two years with a thesis entitled "The Moral End as Moral Excellence". He became the first West African to obtain the Doctor of Philosophy degree from a British university. While he worked on his thesis, he entered the Inner Temple and was called to the Bar in 1926.

During his student days, he had two sons and two daughters by two different women, neither of whom he married. In London, Danquah took time off his studies to participate in student politics, serving as editor of the West African Students' Union (WASU) magazine and becoming the Union's president.

Career
Danquah went into private legal practice upon his return to Ghana in 1927. In 1929 he helped J. E. Casely Hayford found the Gold Coast Youth Conference (GCYC) and was Secretary General from 1937 to 1947. In 1931, Danquah established The Times of West Africa, originally called the West Africa Times, which was the first daily newspaper in Ghana published between 1931 and 1935. A column called "Women's Corner" was pseudonymously written by Mabel Dove, daughter of prominent barrister Francis Dove. She became Danquah's first wife in 1933, bearing him a son. Danquah later married Elizabeth Vardon.  In 1935, he became an executive member of the International African Friends of Ethiopia, a Pan-Africanist organization based in London.

Politics 
Danquah became a member of the Legislative Council in 1946 and actively pursued independence legislation for his country. In 1947 he helped to found the pro-independence United Gold Coast Convention (UGCC) as a combination of chiefs, academics and lawyers, including George Alfred Grant, Robert Benjamin Blay, R. A. Awoonor-Williams, Edward Akufo-Addo, and Emmanuel Obetsebi-Lamptey. Kwame Nkrumah was invited to be the new party's general secretary. In 1948, following a boycott of European imports and subsequent rioting in Accra, Danquah was one of "the big six" (the others being Nkrumah, Akufo-Addo, Obetsebi-Lamptey, Ebenezer Ako-Adjei and William Ofori Atta) who were detained for a month by the colonial authorities.

Danquah's historical research led him to agree with Nkrumah's proposition that on independence the Gold Coast be renamed Ghana after the early African empire of that name. However, Danquah and Nkrumah subsequently disagreed over the direction of the independence movement and parted ways after two years. Nkrumah went on to form the Convention People's Party (CPP) and eventually became the first president of independent Ghana.

Danquah's role in the founding of the University of Ghana 
Danquah played an important role in the establishment of the University of Ghana, the premier and the largest university in Ghana. He successfully advocated for its establishment in 1948 after a British report on higher education in West Africa recommended that only one university college, to be located in Nigeria, in association with the University of London, would be feasible for the whole of West Africa.

Arrest, detention and death
Danquah stood as a presidential candidate against Nkrumah in April 1960 but lost the election. On 3 October 1961, Danquah was arrested under the Preventive Detention Act, on the grounds of involvement with alleged plans to subvert the CPP government. He was released on 22 June 1962. He was later elected president of the Ghana Bar Association.
 
Danquah was again arrested on 8 January 1964, for allegedly being implicated in a plot against the President. He suffered a heart attack and died while in detention at Nsawam Medium Prison on 4 February 1965.
 
After the overthrow of the CPP government in February 1966 by the National Liberation Council (NLC), Danquah was given a national funeral.

Publications 

Among his writings are Gold Coast: Akan Laws and Customs and the Akim Abuakwa Constitution (1928), a play entitled The Third Woman (1943), and The Akan Doctrine of God (1944). The latter book demonstrated the compatibility of African religion with Christianity, and is considered a "milestone" for African Protestants looking for ways to reclaim their African heritage.

Family
Kwaku Boateng and J. B. Danquah were related by marriage.

Legacy

The J. B. Danquah Memorial Lecture Series was inaugurated in 1968 in memory of Danquah, who was also a founding member of the Ghana Academy of Arts and Sciences (GAAS).
The Danquah Institute was set up in commemoration of his work and to promote his ideas posthumously.

Danquah Circle, a roundabout at Osu in Accra, was also named after him.

References

1895 births
1965 deaths
20th-century Ghanaian historians
20th-century Ghanaian lawyers
Akan people
Alumni of the University of London
Candidates for President of Ghana
Fellows of the Ghana Academy of Arts and Sciences
Ghanaian Christians
Ghanaian Freemasons
Ghanaian independence activists
Ghanaian MPs 1951–1954
Ghanaian pan-Africanists
Members of the Inner Temple
Ofori-Atta family
United Gold Coast Convention politicians